Aleksandar Miljković (Serbian Cyrillic: Александар Mиљкoвић; born 23 August 1982) is a Serbian football midfielder who plays for FK Smederevo in the Serbian First League.

He previously played with FK Železničar Smederevo and INON Požarevac.

References

1982 births
Living people
Sportspeople from Smederevo
Serbian footballers
FK Smederevo players
Serbian SuperLiga players
Association football midfielders
Serbian expatriate footballers
Southern Myanmar F.C. players